The 1989 Tour de France was the 76th edition of Tour de France, one of cycling's Grand Tours. The Tour began in Luxembourg with a prologue individual time trial on 1 July and Stage 10 occurred on 11 July with a mountain stage to Superbagnères. The race finished on the Champs-Élysées in Paris on 23 July, with a further individual time trial.

Prologue
1 July 1989 — Luxembourg,  (individual time trial)

Pedro Delgado, the previous year's winner and one of the pre-race favourites to win the Tour, missed the start of the prologue by 2 minutes 40 seconds. This resulted in him finishing last on the stage, 2 minutes 54 seconds behind the yellow jersey.

Stage 1
2 July 1989 — Luxembourg to Luxembourg, 

Søren Lilholt attacked from the start of the stage. The three leading riders then grouped together and extended their lead over the peloton to 11 minutes 30 seconds, before being partially drawn back. Da Silva attacked the other breakaway riders at the  mark and held the lead to the finish line.

Stage 2
2 July 1989 — Luxembourg to Luxembourg,  (team time trial)

Stage 3
3 July 1989 — Luxembourg to Spa, 

This stage contained one Category 3 and one Category 4 climb, and finished on the Circuit de Spa-Francorchamps.

Stage 4
4 July 1989 — Liège to Wasquehal,

Stage 5
6 July 1989 — Dinard to Rennes,  (individual time trial)

This stage departed from Dinard, heading south through Dinan, to Rennes.

Greg LeMond, Sean Yates and Andy Hampsten opted to use triathlon bars, a then-recent introduction, in addition to the bullhorn bars usually fitted to time trial bikes.

Stage 6
7 July 1989 — Rennes to Futuroscope, 

The longest stage of the year's Tour, a flat stage, departed from Rennes heading east to Châteaugiron and then turned south to Janzé. The race headed south-east through Retiers and Martigné-Ferchaud to Pouancé.
The riders continued east through Noyant-la-Gravoyère and Marans, and then south through La Pouëze and Saint-Augustin-des-Bois before the Category 4 climb of the Côte-des-4-Routes. The route continued south through Chanzeaux and Le Breuil-sous-Argenton. Turning east to Massais, the route continued to Thouars and turned south-east to Saint-Jouin-de-Marnes and then Jaunay-Clan, before the finish in Futuroscope.

Stage 7
8 July 1989 — Poitiers to Bordeaux,

Stage 8
9 July 1989 — Labastide-d'Armagnac to Pau,

Stage 9
10 July 1989 — Pau to Cauterets, 

The first mountain stage of the Tour departed south-west from Pau, through Lasseube to Oloron-Sainte-Marie. The route then descended east to the valley floor at Bielle, before beginning a gentle climb south through Laruns and turning east to Eaux-Bonnes. Heading south, the brief climb of the Category 4 Côte de Saint-Savin was followed by a quick descent to Pierrefitte-Nestalas.

Stage 10
11 July 1989 — Cauterets to Superbagnères, 

The mountainous stage departed from Cauterets heading north to Pierrefitte-Nestalas
before turning back south to Luz-Saint-Sauveur. The race then descended east through Cazeaux-de-Larboust to the valley floor at Luchon.

References

1989 Tour de France
Tour de France stages